Kechris is a surname. Notable people with the surname include:

Alexander S. Kechris (born 1946), Greek-American mathematician
Katerina Kechris, American statistician